"Through That Window (Enamorado Estoy)",(English: "Through That Window (I'm In Love)") is a song by American duo Xtreme. It served as the first single for their third album, Chapter Dos (2008).

Charts

References

2008 songs
2008 singles
Xtreme (group) songs